Osnabrück Land is a region in southwest Lower Saxony in Germany, which extends into the state of North Rhine-Westphalia. Its centre is the city of Osnabrück. The region is dominated by the Teutoburg Forest and the River Hase. Originally a variant of Low German was spoken here which belonged to the East-Westphalian dialect. 
The region is generally identified with the district and city of Osnabrück, which largely corresponds to the Prince-Bishopric of Osnabrück in the Holy Roman Empire. The Osnabrück Land Regional Association (Landschaftsverband Osnabrücker Land) looks after cultural issues for the region.

Location 
The southern part of Osnabrück Land borders on Münsterland in the state of North Rhine-Westphalia. To the west the  Tecklenburg Land is the natural continuation of the Osnabrück Land into North Rhine-Westphalia. To the southeast is the Ravensberg Land.
Most of Osnabrück Land borders on other Lower Saxon regions: to the west on the Emsland, to the north on the Oldenburg Land and in the east on the Dümmer region.

External links 
BfN landscape fact file for the Osnabrück Uplands
Osnabrück Land tourist association
Official website of Osnabrück district

Sources 
 Stonjek, Diether: Landkreis Osnabrück. In: de Lange, Norbert und Stonjek, Diether (Hrsg.): Osnabrück und das Osnabrücker Umland. Bramsche 2004, (S. 51 - 66) (Schriftenreihe Kulturregion Osnabrück; herausgegeben vom Landschaftsverband Osnabrücker Land e. V., Band 22).

 
Regions of Lower Saxony